The Old Hungarian Lamentations of Mary (OHLM) is the oldest existing Hungarian poem. It was copied in c. 1300 into a Latin codex, similarly to the first coherent Hungarian text, the Halotti beszéd (Funeral Oration), which was written between 1192 and 1195. Its text is a translation or adaptation of a version of the poem, or rather "sequence", that begins Planctus ante nescia and that was very widespread in medieval Europe. The speaker of the poem is Mary, mother of Jesus as she laments the crucifixion of her son, Jesus Christ while being at the side of his cross on Calvary. As such the poem constitutes an element of Roman Catholic religious poetry. Its interpretation has been much discussed in Hungarian philology, and the meaning of some words and phrases remains disputed. Pais Dezső's interpretation is given herein, but it also relies on earlier relevant results.

The text of the poem

External links 

 The text of the Lamentations of Mary in its original orthographic form and its version normalized according to the Modern Hungarian spelling are available in the Old Hungarian Corpus. 

History of the Hungarians
12th century in Hungary
Hungarian language
Medieval documents of Hungary